Faulconbridge railway station is located on the Main Western line in New South Wales, Australia. It serves the Blue Mountains suburb of Faulconbridge opening on 15 March 1877.

In April 2021 the station was upgraded and received two new lifts and platform tactiles.

Platforms & services
Faulconbridge has one island platform with two sides. It is serviced by NSW TrainLink Blue Mountains Line services travelling from Sydney Central to Lithgow.

Transport links
Blue Mountains Transit operate two routes via Faulconbridge station:
685H: Springwood to Hazelbrook
690K: Springwood to Katoomba

References

External links

Faulconbridge station details Transport for New South Wales

Railway stations in Australia opened in 1877
Regional railway stations in New South Wales
Short-platform railway stations in New South Wales, 6 cars
Main Western railway line, New South Wales